Drishti Rajkhowa (Assamese: দৃষ্টি ৰাজখোৱা) alias Drishti Asom, (Real name: Manoj Rabha) was the Commander of the 109 battalion of ULFA until 2011, the banned outlawed group of Assam. He is said to be one of the close confidantes of the group's commander-in-chief Paresh Baruah and an RPG expert. He is also a central committee member of the group.
In November 2011, ULFA commander-in-chief Paresh Baruah ranked up him as the Deputy commander-in-chief along with Bijay Das alias Bijay Chinese, forming a new central committee after Arabinda Rajkhowa and his followers involved with Lateral talk to GoI.

Militancy life 
Manoj Rabha joined the ULFA in 1988 and adopted the alias Drishti Rajkhowa. He was trained in Myanmar and Afghanistan-Pakistan border.

Secret killing of family
On the night of 9 March 1999, Drishti Rakhowa's parents Dhaneswar Rabha and Sushila Rabha were killed by SULFA, behind the mask of the Secret killings of Assam. Since then, the parental home of Drishti remained 'no person land'.

Surrender Rumor
Though Drishti Rajkhowa surrendered in 2020, a news portal, Times of Assam, published a report in 2016 that Drishti Rajhkhowa will leave the outfit.

Surrender 
On 11 November 2020, Drishti Rajkhowa surrendered in Meghalaya. The Indian Army called a media briefing about his surrender at the Army's Red Horns Division (Rangia) Auditorium on 12 November 2020.

He had to surrender because of continuous Police Operations in Garo Hills. His group had a narrow escape in a Police encounter in Bolchugre village on 20/10/2020 and thereafter the group was gheraoed by Security Forces leaving no other option but to surrender. Paresh Baruah said "Fourteen days back Drishti was engaged in an encounter with security forces in Garo Hills and for seven days he was gheraoed by security forces along with other cadres. He was in constant touch with me and I told him not to take the extreme step and asked him to stop fighting knowing fully well about his wife’s health condition and the wellbeing of his two children. Surrender was the only option for him left." Baruah also said "Rajkhowa was surrounded by the security forces for about a week and that he also thought of committing suicide"

See also
List of top leaders of ULFA
Tapan Baruah
Sanjukta Mukti Fouj
28th Battalion (ULFA)

References

Prisoners and detainees from Assam
ULFA members
Living people
Year of birth missing (living people)